Anna Frances Walker (1830–1913) was an early Australian botanical collector and plant illustrator.

She was born in 1830 at the family home "Rhodes" in Concord, New South Wales on the Parramatta River, one of a large family. In 1832, the family moved to Van Diemen's Land, where she, like her mother, collected and painted botanical subjects. At the age of 16 or 17, she returned to New South Wales to live with her grandmother, and there she was instructed in watercolour painting by Henry Curzon Allport. After the death of her father (1861), the family returned to the Sydney property, "Rhodes" (1870), where Annie remained for the rest of her life.

By August 1881, Anna had amassed a considerable body of work, and she contacted Ferdinand von Mueller in Melbourne,  for help with identifications and advice about publishing.  Eventually, in 1887, she self-published (Flowers of New South Wales(  (a small collection of her paintings), but the poor quality of the lithographs let her down (as did her text, which betrayed little botanical understanding). Plants illustrated were: Ceratopetalum gummiferum, Acacia spectabilis, Epacris longiflora, Zieria laevigata, Blandfordia nobilis, Darwinia fascicularis, Ricinocarpos pinifolius, Epacris microphylla, Sprengelia incarnata, Gompholobium grandiflorum, Bauera rubioides, Melaleuca linariifolia, Eriostemon silicifolius, Kennedia monophylla, Clematis glycinoides.

Ultimately, her collection consisted of some 1700 illustrations of plants from both Tasmania and New South Wales, painted between 1875 and 1910, but she failed to find a publisher, and sold her collection (eight volumes) to David Scott Mitchell for £70 in 1910.

The National Herbarium of Victoria (MEL) holds 19 specimens collected by her in New South Wales, and sent to Mueller between the years of 1892 and 1895.   (Twenty-one letters from Mueller to Anna survive.)

The Australasian Virtual Herbarium lists seventeen specimens collected by "Walker, A.F.", all housed at MEL, of which fourteen are fungi and three are plants. Cortinarius walkeri, a fungus, is named for her, and the type specimen is MEL 0220681A, a specimen she collected.

Awards
In 1873, she was awarded a gold medal for watercolours of Tasmanian flowers at the London International Exhibition; in the Academy of Arts show of 1876,  a certificate of merit; in the International Exhibition of 1879 (in Sydney), a "Highly Commended"; and at the Melbourne Exhibition of 1880, a first place.

References

1830 births
1913 deaths
Australian naturalists
Australian non-fiction writers
Botanical collectors active in Australia
Australian illustrators
Botanical illustrators
19th-century Australian writers
Victorian women writers
Victorian writers
Australian women illustrators
Writers from New South Wales
19th-century Australian painters
19th-century Australian women artists
19th-century Australian women writers